Edward Dudley may refer to:
Edward Bishop Dudley (1789–1855), U.S. politician
Edward R. Dudley (state legislator), politician who served in the North Carolina House of Representatives for Craven County in 1870 and 1872
Edward Richard Dudley (1911–2005), U.S. ambassador
Ed Dudley (1901–1963), American golfer
Ed Dudley (baseball) (fl. 1920s–1930s), American baseball player
Edward Dudley (librarian) (1919–2010), English librarian